The River's Lazy Flow is a Canadian animated short film, directed by Joël Vaudreuil and released in 2013. The film centres on an older man who is at a river cabin with his family, and begins to reminisce about his teenage experience when he had a crush on a girl for the first time.

The film premiered at the 2013 Annecy International Animation Film Festival, and was screened at the 2013 Sommets du cinéma d'animation.

The film won the Jutra Award for Best Animated Short Film at the 16th Jutra Awards in 2014.

References

External links
 

2013 films
2013 animated films
Canadian animated short films
2013 short films
2010s animated short films
2010s Canadian films
Best Animated Short Film Jutra and Iris Award winners